Aviation Machinist's Mates (abbreviated as AD) are United States Navy aircraft engine mechanics that inspect, adjust, test, repair, and overhaul aircraft engines and propellers.  More specifically, ADs install, maintain, and service various aircraft engine types as well as various accessories, gear boxes, related fuel systems, and lubrication systems; determine reasons for engine degradation using various test equipment; perform propeller repairs; handle and service aircraft ashore or aboard ship; and can also serve as aircrewman in various types of aircraft.

History
In the early stages of Naval Aviation, this occupation was performed by Machinist's Mates with an aviation specialty, but qualifying for the aviation specialty required meeting the standards for the general rating as well as those required for the aviation specialty.

The Aviation Machinist's Mate rating was established on July 1, 1921, along with Aviation Metalsmith, Aviation Carpenter's Mate, and Aviation Rigger.  These were the first ratings used specifically for aviation and based solely on aviation requirements.  Aviation Machinist's Mate is the only one of the four that is still in use today, making it the oldest U.S. Naval Aviation Rating still in service.

In April, 1948, the rating's abbreviation was changed from AMM to AD, but the insignia has not changed since 1921.

Aviation Machinist’s Mate functional areas

 General power plant maintenance
 Engine component inspection and maintenance
 Electro/Mechanical maintenance
 Engine linkage maintenance
 Auxiliary power
 Helicopter maintenance
 General maintenance
 Aviation support
 Corrosion control
 Hazardous material control and handling
 Maintenance administration
 Aircraft fuel systems maintenance
 Propeller systems

ADs may be assigned to sea or shore duty any place in the world, so their working environment varies considerably.  They may work in hangars or hangar decks, outside on flight decks or flight lines at air stations.  About 6,100 men and women work in this rating.  Sailors in this rating are required to express themselves clearly in speech and writing, must have no speech impediment, and must pass hearing and color perception tests.  ADs must have good memories and the ability to do repetitive tasks, perform detailed work, and keep accurate records.

Advanced technical and operational training is available in this U.S. Navy rating during later stages of an AD's career development.

See also
 List of United States Navy ratings
 Aviation Maintenance Technician

References

External links

Machinists
United States Navy ratings